Minuscule 673 (in the Gregory-Aland numbering), ε 1391 (von Soden), is a Greek minuscule manuscript of the New Testament, on parchment. Palaeographically it has been assigned to the 12th century. The manuscript is very lacunose. Scrivener labelled it by 619e.

Description 

The codex contains the text of the four Gospels, on 164 parchment leaves (size ), with numerous lacunae (Matthew 1:1-10:42; 13:3-16; 27:24-37; Mark 14:21–Luke 3:16; 4:35-5:23; 7:4-15; Gospel of John). The text is written in one column per page, 19 lines per page.

Text 

The Greek text of the codex is a representative of the Byzantine text-type. Hermann von Soden classified it to the textual family Kr. Kurt Aland placed it in Category V.

According to the Claremont Profile Method it represents family Kr in Luke 10; in Luke 1 and Luke 20 the manuscript is defective.

History 

Scrivener and Gregory dated it to the 12th or 13th century. Currently the manuscript is dated by the INTF to the 12th century.

The manuscript was bought in 1874. It was added to the list of New Testament manuscripts by Scrivener and Gregory. Gregory saw it in 1883. It was examined by Hort and Henry Brandshaw.

Actually the manuscript is housed at the Cambridge University Library (Add. Mss. 1837) in Cambridge.

See also 

 List of New Testament minuscules
 Biblical manuscript
 Textual criticism

References

Further reading 

 

Greek New Testament minuscules
12th-century biblical manuscripts
Manuscripts in Cambridge